Vinoy Thomas is an Indian writer who writes in Malayalam. Known for his novels, Karikkottakkari and Puttu as well as for his short stories such as Ramachi, Thomas is a recipient of the Kerala Sahitya Akademi Award for Story and Kerala Sahitya Akademi Award for Novel. Churuli, a Lijo Jose Pellissery movie, is based on one of his stories.

Biography 
Vinoy Thomas was born in Nellikkampoyil, near Iritty in Kannur district of the south Indian state of Kerala. After early education at St. Joseph's High School, Kunnoth, he completed his college education from the University of Calicut and joined the Government High School, Ulikkal where he serves as a teacher. He is married to Gigimol and the couple has a son, Adwait and a daughter, Akshari.

Literary career 
Ramachi, the first book published by Thomas, was a short story anthology and the book was released in 2014. Subsequently, he published his debut novel, Karikkottakkari, which narrated the lives of the migrants in a Kannur village of the same name. His next novel, Puttu (Molehill) was released in 2020 and it discussed incestual relationships in a high range village. He has also published another short story anthology, titled Mullaranjaanam (Waistband of Thorns). Churuli, a 2020 Malayalam film by Lijo Jose Pellissery is based on a short story by Vinoy Thomas.

Filmography

Awards and honors 

Vinoy Thomas received the 2019 Kerala Sahitya Akademi Award for Story for his anthology, Ramachi, the award announced in 2021. The anthology had earlier received the 'Edakkadu Sahithya Vedi Puraskaram'. He is also a recipient of 'Sakhav Verghese Memorial Award', 'Joseph Mundassery Award', 'V. P. Sivakumar Keli Award' and 'Kunjamu Purakkad Memorial Award'. He received the 2021 Kerala Sahitya Akademi Award for Novel for Puttu.

Selected bibliography

Novels

Short story anthologies

See also 

 S. Hareesh
 N. Prabhakaran

References

Further reading

External links 
 
 
 

Living people
Writers from Kerala
People from Kannur district
Indian male short story writers
Malayalam-language writers
Malayalam short story writers
Recipients of the Kerala Sahitya Akademi Award
Malayalam novelists
Indian male novelists
Date of birth missing (living people)
Year of birth missing (living people)